The Men's mass start race of the 2016 World Single Distances Speed Skating Championships was held on 14 February 2016.

Results
The race was started at 17:15.

References

Men's mass start